Barang-e Kuchak (also Romanized as Barang-e Kūchak, Barang-e Kūchek, and Berang-e Kūchek; also known as Barmak-e Kūchek) is a village in Vahdatiyeh Rural District, Sadabad District, Dashtestan County, Bushehr Province, Iran. At the 2006 census, its population was 51, in 7 families.

References 

Populated places in Dashtestan County